Jive Records (later stylized as JIVE Records) was a British-American independent record label founded by Clive Calder in 1981 as a subsidiary of the Zomba Group. In the US, the label had offices in New York City and Chicago. Jive was best known for its successes with hip hop, R&B, and dance acts in the 1980s and 1990s, along with teen pop and boy bands during the late 1990s and early 2000s.

Jive was acquired by Bertelsmann Music Group in 2002. In 2008, BMG itself was bought out by Sony Music Entertainment. Jive Records thereupon remained a unit wholly owned by Sony up until the label’s dissolution in 2011, when Jive was absorbed into RCA Records.

History

1970s: Beginnings
In 1971, South African businessmen Clive Calder and Ralph Simon began a publishing and management company. It was named Zomba Records and relocated to London, England, four years later; their first client was a young Robert "Mutt" Lange. Zomba originally wanted to avoid record labels to instead focus on their songwriters and producers while allowing other established labels to release the material. Later that decade, the company opened offices in the US, where Calder began a business relationship with Clive Davis, whose Arista Records began releasing material by Zomba artists.

1980s: Formation and early distribution at Arista and RCA
In 1981, Zomba formed Jive Records, whose operations began with the release of British dance and pop music from groups such as Q-Feel, A Flock of Seagulls, and Tight Fit. Its name was inspired by township Jive, a type of music that originated in South Africa. Clive Davis had hoped that Zomba's connection with Mutt Lange would help alleviate the difficulties Arista was having with launching rock acts to success.

By 1982, Calder was introduced to Barry Weiss, a young college graduate who took Calder out to hip-hop clubs in New York City for his job interview with Zomba. Weiss and Calder began grooming musicians for what would eventually become the hip hop group Whodini. After two days, the group created and recorded its hit single "Magic's Wand." While the group would eventually leave Jive, the early success allowed the label to focus on hip-hop artists throughout the 1980s. In 1987, Jive cut distribution ties with Arista, effectively separating them from Davis, who eschewed hip hop music at his label. As the 1980s drew to a close, the label entered a distribution deal with Arista's sister label RCA Records, and it continued to sign hip hop acts including DJ Jazzy Jeff & The Fresh Prince, Boogie Down Productions, Too $hort, Schoolly D, and Kid Rock.

1990s: Hip hop and teen pop 
In 1990, Calder bought Simon’s stake in Zomba and became the sole owner of Jive Records. Jive's distribution deal with RCA expired in 1991. At this time, Bertelsmann Music Group acquired a minority share of the label and began to distribute its records directly. Weiss became chief executive of Jive Records that year. Jive opened branches in Chicago and had also become a premier label in the genres of hip hop and R&B with the success of acts like D-Nice, E-40, UGK, A Tribe Called Quest, Hi-Five, KRS-One/Boogie Down Productions, R. Kelly and Aaliyah. In 1996, BMG deepened its relationship with the label by purchasing a 20-percent stake of Jive. By the late 1990s, Jive began signing pop acts Backstreet Boys, NSYNC and Britney Spears. All three acts achieved massive success as the 2000s dawned, becoming the three best-selling acts in the label's history.

2000s: Acquisition by BMG and Sony
In 2002, Calder sold Zomba to BMG for US$2.74 billion, which at the time was the largest-ever acquisition of an independent label with major-label distribution. Calder then announced his resignation from Zomba, but continued to stay on at Jive in a temporary advisory role as Zomba was integrated into BMG. Weiss succeeded Calder as the new head of Zomba. In 2004, BMG merged with Sony Music Entertainment to form Sony BMG. During this time, Jive's management and distribution were restructured under the newly formed Zomba Label Group. Artists who had previously been on LaFace and Arista Records were subsequently absorbed under the Zomba group and placed under the purview of Jive Records’ staff. Thus, artists such as Pink, Usher, and Outkast became de facto Jive artists. Though both physical record sales and teen pop had steadily declined since the early 2000s, the output from Jive’s newer artists — particularly Usher’s Confessions album and Outkast’s Speakerboxxx/The Love Below — would prove to be profitable successes for Jive. In addition to releasing Spears’ 2007 album Blackout, Jive was now also the home of a solo Justin Timberlake, whose FutureSex/LoveSounds also saw high sales. Other Jive artists at that time included Ciara and Chris Brown.

By early 2008, the BMG Label Group was said to include RCA Records, J Records, LaFace, Arista, Volcano Entertainment, Verity, GospoCentric and Fo Yo Soul  — all overseen by Weiss. Later that year, Sony and BMG dissolved its merger, with the former buying out shares of the latter. As a result of Sony's buyout, Jive (along with its BMG sisters RCA and Arista) became a wholly owned unit of a refreshed Sony Music Entertainment. Starting in 2008 Jive was all capital (e.g. JIVE Records), this change started when BMG Label Group was renamed RCA/JIVE Label Group.

2010s: Dormancy
After two decades as president of Jive, Barry Weiss left for Universal Music Group in March 2011. On October 7, 2011, it was announced that Jive, along with Arista and J Records, would be retired to refresh and re-brand RCA Records by not confusing or diluting it with other labels. All retained artists on those labels were then moved to RCA Records.

The label is currently in hibernation, with the distribution of its back catalog handled by Sony Music's Legacy Recordings. Previously, the Jive brand was being exclusively used under the Sony Music France division under the name Jive Epic in France until 2019, when it was absorbed into RCA Records France.

Criticism and controversies
On September 27, 2021, singer R. Kelly was found guilty by a federal jury of acts including bribery and sexual exploitation of a child. Allegations of Kelly’s sexual misconduct had long followed the singer since his early career with Jive in the early 1990s, as well as throughout the 2000s when a video tape surfaced allegedly showing Kelly engaging in sexual acts with a minor and when Kelly was arrested for possession of child pornography. Despite the scandals, Kelly remained signed to Jive’s roster and continued to release albums with the label up to 2010. In 2018, the Washington Post ran a lengthy article alleging industry executives at Jive had been aware of Kelly's sexually abusive behavior towards young women for years, but did nothing about them due to his success as a performer and songwriter. Though the article reported Clive Calder had been warned about Kelly’s behavior as early as 1994, Calder retrospectively told the Post he regretted not having done more at the time, saying "Clearly, we missed something”. Former Jive president Barry Weiss told the newspaper that during his 20 years with the label, he never concerned himself with Kelly's private life, and was unaware of two lawsuits filed against Kelly and the label by women alleging sexual misconduct, suits in which the label had successfully argued it was not liable. Larry Khan, another Jive executive who worked closely with the singer even after viewing the sex tape, similarly implied Kelly’s misconduct was not the label's responsibility.

Discography

Artists
 List of current Jive Records artists (artists at time of Jive’s 2011 disestablishment)
 List of former Jive Records artists (artists previously signed to Jive)

See also 
Zomba Group of Companies

RCA/Jive Label Group

List of record labels

References

Bibliography

External links

 Zomba Label Group (archived)
 Sony BMG Music Entertainment (archived)
 Video interview with Jeff Fenster (Senior Vice President of A&R at Jive Records)
 
 

Record labels established in 1981
Record labels disestablished in 2011
American record labels
Pop record labels
Hip hop record labels
Rock record labels
RCA Records
Electronic dance music record labels
Sony Music
Zomba Group of Companies subsidiaries
IFPI members